CEAT Cricket Ratings (CCR) was formed in 1995 in association with Professional Management Group. Three cricketing legends Clive Lloyd, Ian Chappell and Sunil Gavaskar are the members of the Governing Council of the CRR. 
This rating system takes into account the performances in Test Cricket and One Day Internationals over a period of 12 months from 1 May to 30 April. The system takes into account overall performances, the Batting, Bowling, Fielding and Wicket Keeping.

It is the first International Cricket Rating System to reward and recognize the performances on annual basis. CEAT has also introduced the CCR Best Bowler, CCR Best Batsman, CCR Best Cricketer and CCR Best Cricket Team as well as CEAT Under 19 & T20 ratings.

Winners of the CEAT Cricket Rating

See also
 Cricket Rating Systems

References

External links
 
 Point System followed by CEAT Rating System

Cricket awards and rankings